Alexander Wunderer (11 April 1877 – 29 December 1955) was an Austrian oboist, orchestra leader and composer. He served as a professor at the State Music Academy in Vienna, where he taught students including Frida Kern, Ľudovít Rajter and Herbert von Karajan. He played as principal oboist with the Vienna Philharmonic and later served as executive director and manager of the orchestra.

Selected works
24 Etüden in allen Tonarten (24 etudes in all keys) for oboe (1924)
Sonata for viola and piano, Op. 21 (1946)
Duet for 2 violas (1948)
Zinkenbacher-Variationen, Theme and 10 Variations for piano, Op. 24 (published 1952)
Aufbruch zur Jagd und Hallali
Ländler for 4 horns
Ländler Trio No. 1 for oboe, bassoon and piano
Waldruhe

References

External links

1877 births
1955 deaths
Place of birth missing
Place of death missing
Austrian composers
Austrian male composers
Austrian oboists
Male oboists